A Virgin Paradise is a lost 1921 American silent adventure film produced and distributed by Fox Film Corporation and starring serial queen Pearl White. It was directed by veteran director J. Searle Dawley.

Cast

Pearl White as Gratia Latham
Robert Elliott as Bob Alan
Jack Baston as Slim (credited as J. Thornton Baston)
Alan Edwards as Bernard Holt
Henrietta Floyd as Mrs. Holt
Grace Beaumont as Constance Holt
Mary Beth Barnelle as Ruth Hastings
Lynn Pratt as The Attorney
Lewis Sealy as Peter Latham (credited as Lewis Seeley)
Charles Sutton as Captain Mulhall
Hal Clarendon as John Latham

See also
1937 Fox vault fire

References

External links

 

1921 films
American silent feature films
Fox Film films
Lost American films
Films directed by J. Searle Dawley
1921 adventure films
American black-and-white films
American adventure films
Lost adventure films
1921 lost films
1920s American films
Silent adventure films